Marupacha is a 1982 Indian Malayalam film, directed and produced by S. Babu. The film stars Prem Nazir,  Swapna and Sukumari in the lead roles. The film has musical score by A. T. Ummer.

Cast

Prem Nazir as Premachandran, Prem Kumar (double role)
Swapna as Swapna
Jagathy Sreekumar as Kumar
Kaviyoor Ponnamma as Ponnamma
Sankaradi as Sankaradi Sankunni Menon
Sukumaran as Sukumaran
K. K. Menon
Balan K. Nair as Mammathikka
Janardanan as Janardanan
Justin
Kanakadurga as Durga
Mala Aravindan as Professor Malavya
Rajasekharan] as Rajashekharan
Ranipadmini as Rani
Sadhana as Sadhana
Saraswathi
Sharmila as Sharmila
Suchitra 
Vazhoor Rajan
Sulekha (Old) as Lekha
 Mohan Vadookkara
 Vanam Savior

Soundtrack
The music was composed by A. T. Ummer and the lyrics were written by Poovachal Khader.

References

External links
 

1982 films
1980s Malayalam-language films